Richard Montgomery (1738–1775) was an Irish-born soldier.

Richard Montgomery may also refer to:
Richard Mattern Montgomery (1911–1987), United States Air Force general
Richard Montgomery (politician) (born 1946), Tennessee politician
SS Richard Montgomery, a still-dangerous ship loaded with explosives sunk in 1944 in the Thames Estuary, England

See also
Richard Montgomerie (born 1971), cricketer
Richard Montgomery High School, Rockville, Maryland

Montgomery, Richard